In Greek mythology, Harpalyce (Ancient Greek: Ἁρπαλύκη) is a name attributed to four women.

Harpalyce, character in Theseid by Boccaccio 

A woman subordinate to Queen Hippolyta of the Amazons. Orders an attack against Theseus. Most likely one of the same woman mentioned in the other myths below.

Harpalyce, daughter of Clymenus
Harpalyce was the daughter of King Clymenus of Arcadia, son of either Schoeneus (first version) or of Teleus of Argos (second version). Clymenus was overcome with passion for his daughter. There are several versions of what happened next, of which all embody an incestuous father and a vengeful feast in which a child is killed and served up.

In the first version Clymenus, son of Schoeneus, raped his daughter and she became pregnant. When the son was born she served him up as a meal at a banquet to his father, who killed her over that. In an alternative version of this tale, she was instead transformed into a bird, the chalkis (see second version below).

In the second version Harpalyce was the daughter of Clymenus son of Teleus of Argos, and of Epicasta, and has two brothers: Idas and Therager. Clymenus was overcome with passion for his daughter and secretly embarked on an affair with her that lasted for some time. Finally, Alastor, descendant of Neleus, came to claim Harpalyce as his wife, she having been betrothed to him since she was young. When the couple were halfway to their home, Clymenus abducted her back and lived with her openly as his wife. Harpalyce, being upset by father's treatment of her, killed her younger brother and served him up to his father at a banquet. She then prayed to the gods and was transformed into a bird called the chalkis (a sort of night owl). Clymenus killed himself.

Harpalyce, daughter of Harpalycus
Harpalyce was the daughter of Harpalykos, king of the Amymnei in Thrace. Her mother died and her father suckled her from the teats of heifers and mares. He trained her as a warrior, intending for her to succeed him as ruler. When Neoptolemus, returning from Troy, attacked Harpalycus and severely wounded him, his daughter retaliated, putting the enemy to flight and saving her father. After her father's death at the hands of the rebellious people, Harpalyce took to plundering herds of cattle, taking advantage of her own ability to run outstandingly fast; eventually she was killed by a group of herdsmen as she got caught in a snare.

Harpalyce, eponym of a song contest
Aristoxenus in his Brief Memoranda made mention of Harpalyce, a maiden that was in love with one Iphiclus but never had her feelings answered and eventually died of grief. To commemorate her, a song contest among maidens was established and named "Harpalyce".

Notes

References 

 Athenaeus of Naucratis, The Deipnosophists or Banquet of the Learned. London. Henry G. Bohn, York Street, Covent Garden. 1854. Online version at the Perseus Digital Library.
 Athenaeus of Naucratis, Deipnosophistae. Kaibel. In Aedibus B.G. Teubneri. Lipsiae. 1887. Greek text available at the Perseus Digital Library.
 Gaius Julius Hyginus, Fabulae from The Myths of Hyginus translated and edited by Mary Grant. University of Kansas Publications in Humanistic Studies. Online version at the Topos Text Project.
 Nonnus of Panopolis, Dionysiaca translated by William Henry Denham Rouse (1863-1950), from the Loeb Classical Library, Cambridge, MA, Harvard University Press, 1940.  Online version at the Topos Text Project.
 Nonnus of Panopolis, Dionysiaca. 3 Vols. W.H.D. Rouse. Cambridge, MA., Harvard University Press; London, William Heinemann, Ltd. 1940-1942. Greek text available at the Perseus Digital Library.
 Parthenius, Love Romances translated by Sir Stephen Gaselee (1882-1943), S. Loeb Classical Library Volume 69. Cambridge, MA. Harvard University Press. 1916.  Online version at the Topos Text Project.
 Parthenius, Erotici Scriptores Graeci, Vol. 1. Rudolf Hercher. in aedibus B. G. Teubneri. Leipzig. 1858. Greek text available at the Perseus Digital Library.

Princesses in Greek mythology
Family of Athamas
Mythological Thracian women
Metamorphoses into birds in Greek mythology
Arcadian mythology
Mythology of Argos
Incest in Greek mythology